This article lists the CDs and DVDs featuring the Doodlebops, a  Canadian television children's television series show for children. "Rock & Bop with The Doodlebops", (Disney Records USA), was released in 2006. Other CDs and DVDs were released later.

CDs

Get On The Bus (2007) 
 Tick Tock
 I Can Dance
 She's A Superstar
 You're The Best
 Hold Your Horses
 More Fun
 It's Up To You
 Different Things
 Get On Board
 Jump Up
 When You're Good at Something
 You Betcha
 My Hero
 My Ukulele
 Let's Get Loud
 What You've Got
 Your Favorite Color
 You Are My Friend
 Who Can It Be
 Rockin' the World
 Get On The Bus II

Rock & Bop with The Doodlebops (2006) 
 We're The Doodlebops
 The Pledge
 Wobbly Whoopsy
 Look in a Book
 I Want to Be Bigger
 Get On The Bus
 Hey Moe
 The Bird Song
 Count to Ten
 Queen for a Day
 Getting Along
 Gibble Gobble
 My Friend
 Write A Letter
 Tap Tap Tap
 Faces
 When the Lights Go Out
 Cauliflower
 Keep Trying
 Together Forever
 Thank You

Playhouse Disney: Imagine & Learn With Music features two Doodlebop songs; "Wobbly Whoopsy" & "Together Forever".

DVDs

Music and Fun (Vol. 1) 
 Tap Tap Tap
 Queen For a day Deedee
 High and Low
 Bonus features: Musical instruments flash cards, "We're the Doodlebops" music video
 Includes a CD with:
 We're the Doodlebops
 The Pledge
 Get on the Bus
 High and Low
 Tap Tap Tap
 Queen For a Deedee

Let's Move! (Vol. 2) 
 Wobbly Whoopsy
 The Move Groove
 Jumpin' Judy
 Bonus features: "Wobbly Whoopsy" music video, 2 Bus dance scenes
 Includes a CD with:
 We're the Doodlebops
 The Pledge
 Get on the Bus
 Wobbly Whoopsy
 Jumpin' Judy
 On The Move

Let's Have Some Fun! (Vol. 3) 
 Gibble Gobble Nabber Gabber
 Cauliflower Power
 Junk Funk
 Roar Like A Dinosaur (Bonus Episode)
 Bonus feature: Knock knock jokes

Abracadeedee It's Magic (Vol. 4) 
 Glad Sad Bumpy Grumpy
 Fast And Slow Moe
 Abracadeedee
 What Did You See Today? (Bonus Episode)
 Bonus feature: "Abracadeedee" music video

Twist, Turn, Dance and Learn (Vol. 5) 
 Look In a Book
 What When Why
 Strudel Doodle
 All Together Now (Bonus Episode)
 Bonus feature: "All Together Now" music video

Rock And Bop with the Doodlebops (Released: August 1, 2006) 
 All Together Now
 High and Low
 What Did You See Today?
 Junk Funk
 Bonus features
 "We're the Doodlebops" music video
 "Wobbly Whoopsy" music video
 "Abracadeedee" music video
 4 Sing-alongs
 4 Knock knock jokes

Dance & Hop with the Doodlebops (Released: August 1, 2006) 
 Tap Tap Tap
 Jumpin' Judy
 The Move Groove
 Wobbly Whoopsy
 Bonus features
 "We're the Doodlebops" music video
 "Wobbly Whoopsy" music video
 "Abracadeedee" music video
 4 Sing-alongs
 Knock knock jokes

Superstars (Released:  Jan 23, 2007  ) 
 Doodlebops Photo Op
 Count On Me
 Cauliflower Power
 What, When, Why?

Get Up & Groove (Releases April 24, 2007) 
 Fast And Slow Moe
 Step By Step
 Flat Sitis
 The Bad Day

Discographies of Canadian artists
Film and television discographies
Pop music group discographies